NK Mostanje ALL is a Croatian football club based in the city of Karlovac.

External links

Association football clubs established in 1949
Football clubs in Croatia
1949 establishments in Croatia
Sport in Karlovac
Mostanje